Cataldo Ambulance Service and Atlantic Ambulance Service (a division of Cataldo Ambulance Service) provide dedicated ambulance (EMS) services to communities throughout the Greater Boston and North Shore areas in the U.S. Commonwealth of Massachusetts. They serve the following communities: Chelsea, Danvers, Everett, Holyoke, Lynn, Malden, Marblehead, Newburyport, Peabody, Revere, Salem, Stoneham, Somerville, Swampscott, Wakefield, and Wellesley. With base locations throughout all of their 911 communities, Cataldo and Atlantic Ambulance have a wide service area dedicating emergency services, primary backup services, as well as medical transportation to a number of nursing homes, hospitals and other medical facilities throughout the Greater Boston and North Shore areas.

Company divisions

Cataldo Ambulance operates with three divisions, each with their respective dispatch/operations centers, but single administrative center.

Somerville division
The Somerville division, the company's original region, handles emergency and non-emergency services to multiple cities in the northern Metro Boston area. The company's main administrative departments (including billing and accounts payable) operate out of the Somerville division. The Somerville division's operations center was originally located in Somerville, hence the name, but has recently moved to Malden. See Company History, which houses human resources, clinical services, education, Information Technology and corporate offices. The division is referred to as the "Somerville division" however the operations center is called "Malden Operations."

Boston division
The Boston division handles 911 emergencies for the Town of Wellesley as well as many contracts in Boston and surrounding areas. Their most notable contracts are with: The Hebrew Rehabilitation Center, Boston Children's Hospital, Partners HealthCare, TD Garden, and Fenway Park. The BIDMC, in 2007, sponsored two branded ambulances, via donations, to Cataldo Ambulance for the sole use of interfacility transport. These ambulances and the BIDMC contract are now through Transformative Healthcare. The Boston division also handles backup (along with other private companies) to Boston EMS for 911 response to the City of Boston. Primary 911 ambulance service in Wellesley.

Cataldo's Boston division operates primarily out of a base in Needham, Massachusetts, which houses an average of 9 ambulances, a field supervisor, and crew quarters. Additional vehicles are located at firehouses throughout the Town of Wellesley.

Atlantic division
In 2008, Atlantic Ambulance purchased North Shore Ambulance company. Atlantic then had the rights to all of Northshores' contracts. Atlantic uses a white yellow and blue logo and color-scheme on their ambulances. They have their own dispatch and field operations management, however administratively they fall under Cataldo Ambulance. They are referred to as Atlantic Ambulance Service, a division of Cataldo Ambulance. This division services Lynn, Salem, Marblehead, Peabody, Newburyport, Salisbury, Swampscott, Wakefield, and West Newbury.

Company history
Cataldo was founded in 1977.
Starting July 1, 2008, Cataldo Ambulance acquired the 911 contract for the City of Melrose. This acquisition came after Melrose ended a 10-year contract with another private ambulance service, Action Ambulance. The contract between Cataldo Ambulance and the City of Melrose was signed for three years. Melrose Mayor Rob Dolan said, "Cataldo Ambulance is one of the largest ambulance service providers in the area...The proposal offered the best combination of direct services to the citizens of Melrose and financial benefits to the City of Melrose, as well as countless training opportunities for our public safety employees. The entire package of services offered was superior.” After a formal bid process in September 2010, the City of Melrose signed a three-year agreement with Cataldo Ambulance Service as the City's continued dedicated emergency medical services provider. "Cataldo not only has a strong presence in the city but their emergency response time far exceeds that of the national average. The equipment that is standard to their operations is above what is considered normal standards of care," stated Melrose Mayor Robert Dolan in a press release.
Cataldo's Atlantic Ambulance division also acquired an additional 911 contract in July 2008. The City of Peabody ended a near decade-long contract with Northshore Ambulance by awarding Atlantic Ambulance, a division of Cataldo Ambulance, with the city's EMS coverage. Several months thereafter on December 15, 2008, Atlantic Ambulance, a division of Cataldo Ambulance, purchased Northshore Ambulance company, thus acquiring the 911 contracts to the City of Salem, and the Town of Marblehead. Atlantic's coverage of the Town of Marblehead began on November 21, 2008, and on December 1, 2008, began providing EMS services to the City of Salem.
In September 2009, Cataldo Ambulance Service moved its main operations center from Somerville to Malden into a new state-of-the-art, combined operations and training center. The previous training center was located in Chelsea. The Somerville base is still utilized for administration and ambulance services.

Communications
Cataldo and Atlantic's new VHF system went into effect around the beginning of December 2006. Communication protocols vary with each of Cataldo's contracted municipalities, however most of them rely on direct radio communication between the covering 911 unit and each area's "Fire Alarm" dispatcher. Every ambulance in the fleet has the capability of communicating with all three  of Cataldo's dispatch centers (one for each division), including tactical operations channels, fire department dispatch centers for their entire coverage area, and C-Med (ambulance-to-hospital) communications for all of the Massachusetts EMS regions.

Community service and accolades
Cataldo Ambulance has a long reputation of making charitable donations to the communities that it serves. Be it in the form of tangible gifts or life-saving education, the goal is to ensure the highest quality of medical care and knowledge to all of the residents of their communities. Furthermore, Cataldo Ambulance regularly hosts and participates in fundraising events that benefit non-profit research organizations like the American Cancer Society.
 1993, annually. Cataldo Ambulance's Swing Fore Hope annual golf tournament to make contributions to the fight against cancer. All proceeds are donated to the American Cancer Society's Hope Lodge Boston.
 December 2001, annually. Cataldo Ambulance partners with the Somerville Housing Authority to collect toys for needy children for the winter holiday season. Cataldo participates annually by stationing an ambulance at the local K-Mart to collect the goods.
 March 2005. Twenty-four Everett school teachers received free CPR/AED training compliments of Cataldo Ambulance after Winter Hill Bank donated two AEDs to Everett Schools.
 November 2005. Cataldo Ambulance honored 12 EMTs and Paramedics who spent a total of four weeks, deployed in two teams each for two weeks, in disaster areas post-Hurricane Rita in Texas.
 February 2007, annually. Cataldo aids the American Cancer Society's Daffodil Days campaign. This too has become a routine event in which Cataldo Ambulance and its employees participate.
 May, 2007. Cataldo sponsors mock "mash-up" in collaboration with many Malden officials and the Members of Students Against Destructive Decisions. This has become a routine annual event in several of Cataldo's communities in order to show high-school students the dangers of drunk driving - especially for seniors nearing the prom.
 September 2007. Cataldo Ambulance partners with Malden Fire and Police Departments in order to equip new command vehicles with OEMS-approved first-in EMS bags. They were recognized by the Malden Kiwanis Club.
 February 2008. Cataldo Ambulance Service donates four defibrillators to Saugus Fire Department
 April, 2008. Cataldo Ambulance Field Supervisor recognized by Everett Chamber as "Paramedic of the Year." Paramedic Supervisor O'Connell was recognized for his significant role as the first EMS responder on scene of a tanker rollover disaster that occurred in Everett in December 2007.
 September 2008. Atlantic Ambulance donates an AED to St. Mary's High School's (Lynn, MA) Athletic Department.
 November 2008. Cataldo Ambulance Service donates former field-supervisor vehicle SUV to City of Melrose Fire Department.
 December 2008. Cataldo Ambulance Only Private Service In State Equipping Vehicles With Priority Traffic Control System (3M Opticom e.g. see Traffic signal preemption).
 February 2009. Atlantic Ambulance Service donates four AEDs over four years to City of Peabody and to St. John's Baptist School.
 October 2009. Cataldo donates a used ambulance to the City of Somerville for conversion into a PD Incident Command Vehicle.
 December 2009. Cataldo Ambulance Service's Vice President, Dennis Cataldo, receives the "Region IV EMS Leader Award" from the Metropolitan Boston Emergency Medical Services Council (MBEMSC).
 January 2010. Atlantic Ambulance staffs a Peabody clinic providing H1N1 vaccines.
 May 2010. Cataldo Ambulance Golf Tournament Raises $28,000 for American Cancer Society.

Operations

Somerville Division

The Somerville Division services the cities of Chelsea, Everett, Malden, Revere, and Somerville with dedicated 911 ALS units 24 hours-a-day, and provides backup coverage as requested by the City of Melrose. Each municipality has a dedicated Cataldo EMS ALS unit and backup coverage is provided by additional non-dedicated ALS and BLS units positioned at bases throughout the coverage area. The primary trucks are as follows:

Boston Division
Dedicated Cataldo EMS (Boston Division) units for the town of Wellesley, additional ALS/BLS used as backup when needed (as of 12/28/09)

Atlantic Ambulance Division

Dedicated Atlantic EMS units for the cities of Lynn, Peabody, Salem, and Newburyport, and the towns of Marblehead and Swampscott, with additional non-dedicated ALS and BLS used as backup when needed.

Command staff
Cataldo and Atlantic Ambulance ALS Shift Commanders utilize non-transporting SUV's that contain ALS equipment and are designated as a (Class V ambulance.) 
The Company has 3 EMS Command Vehicles and a heavy duty utility vehicle (Tango 1) capable of towing MCI and Incident Support trailers.
S-4- Director of Operations (Cataldo Division)
S-5- Director of Operations (Atlantic Division)

Controversies 
Cataldo Ambulance Service was found liable for discrimination against an employee by the Massachusetts Commission Against Discrimination and ordered to pay lost wages and punitive damages to an employee who was fired while pregnant. 

On August 6, 2021, Cataldo Ambulance Service, Inc. (Cataldo), Somerville, Massachusetts, entered into a $704,706.62 settlement agreement with OIG. The settlement agreement resolves allegations that Cataldo presented claims to Medicare Part B for ambulance transportation to and from skilled nursing facilities (SNFs) where such transportation was already covered by the SNF consolidated billing payment under Medicare Part A. 

A 2016 MassHealth Audit report showed Cataldo Ambulance Service did not maintain properly completed Medical Necessity Forms (MNFs) for wheelchair car services. This affected services that totaled as much as $942,326. 

Also in 2016, Massachusetts Attorney General Maura Healey has announced her office has sued Cataldo Ambulance Service Inc. (Cataldo) for $600,000 after allegations the company overbilled the state’s Medicaid program (MassHealth). From 2005 to November 2015, the state alleges Cataldo billed MassHealth for emergency advanced life support (ALS) services in scenarios where patients only needed emergency basic life support (BLS) services.

References

External links
Official site

Companies based in Middlesex County, Massachusetts
Ambulance services in the United States
Emergency services in Massachusetts
American companies established in 1977
1977 establishments in Massachusetts
Medical and health organizations based in Massachusetts
Health care companies established in 1977